George A. Hannauer (December 19, 1872 – November 2, 1929) was the president of the Boston and Maine Railroad.

He was born in St. Louis, Missouri. He died in New Haven, Connecticut, of a heart attack while attending the Yale-Dartmouth football game.

References

1872 births
1929 deaths
Boston and Maine Railroad
Businesspeople from St. Louis